Caloptilia acerifoliella is a moth of the family Gracillariidae. It is known from the United States (Colorado and Utah).

The larvae feed on Acer species, including Acer glabrum and Acer grandidentatum. They mine the leaves of their host plant. The mine has the form of a short linear mine, ending in a small blotch with either the upper or lower epidermis loosened. Later, the leaf is rolled downwards, first from one side, then from the other, and then from the tip.

References

External links
mothphotographersgroup

acerifoliella
Moths of North America
Moths described in 1875